Anarchists have employed certain symbols for their cause, including most prominently the circle-A and the black flag. Anarchist cultural symbols have been prevalent in popular culture since around the turn of the 21st century, concurrent with the anti-globalization movement. The punk subculture has also had a close association with anarchist symbolism.

Flags

Red flag 

The red flag was one of first anarchist symbols and it was widely used in late 19th century by anarchists worldwide. Peter Kropotkin wrote that he preferred the use of the red flag.

Use of the red flag by anarchists largely disappeared after the October Revolution, when red flags started to be associated only with Bolshevism and communist parties and authoritarian, bureaucratic and reformist social democracy, or authoritarian socialism.

Black flag 
The black flag has been associated with anarchism since the 1880s, when several anarchist organizations and journals adopted the name Black Flag.

Howard J. Ehrlich writes in Reinventing Anarchy, Again:

The origins of the black flag are uncertain. Modern anarchism has a shared ancestry with—amongst other ideologies—socialism, a movement strongly associated with the red flag. As anarchism became more and more distinct from socialism in the 1880s, it adopted the black flag in an attempt to differentiate itself. It was flown in the 1831 Canut revolt, in which the black represented the mourning of liberty lost.

The French anarchist paper, Le Drapeau Noir (The Black Flag), which existed until 1882, is one of the first published references to use black as an anarchist color. Black International was the name of a London anarchist group founded in July 1881.One of the first known anarchist uses of the black flag was by Louise Michel, participant in the Paris Commune in 1871. Michel flew the black flag during a demonstration of the unemployed which took place in Paris on March 9, 1883. With Michel at the front carrying a black flag and shouting "Bread, work, or lead!," the crowd of 500 protesters soon marched off towards the boulevard Saint-Germain and pillaged three baker's shops before the police arrested them. Michel was arrested and sentenced to six years solitary confinement. Public pressure soon forced the granting of an amnesty. She wrote, "the black flag is the flag of strikes and the flag of those who are hungry".

The black flag soon made its way to the United States. The black flag was displayed in Chicago at an anarchist demonstration in November 1884. According to the English language newspaper of the Chicago anarchists, it was "the fearful symbol of hunger, misery and death". Thousands of anarchists attended Kropotkin's 1921 funeral behind the black flag.

Bisected flag 

The colors black and red have been used by anarchists since at least the late 1800s when they were used on cockades by Italian anarchists in the 1874 Bologna insurrection and in 1877 when anarchists entered the Italian town Letino carrying red and black flags to promote the First International. Diagonally divided red and black flags were used by anarcho-syndicalists in Spain such as the labor union CNT during the Spanish Civil War. George Woodcock writes that the bisected black-and-red flag symbolized a uniting of "the spirit of later anarchism with the mass appeal of the [First] International".

Symbols

Circle-A  

The symbol composed of the capital letter A surrounded by a circle is universally recognized as a symbol of anarchism and has been established in global youth culture since the 1970s. An interpretation held by anarchists such as Cindy Milstein is that the A represents the Greek  ('without ruler/authority'), and the circle can be read as the letter O, standing for order or organization, a reference to Pierre-Joseph Proudhon's definition of anarchism from his 1840 book What Is Property?: "as man seeks justice in equality, so society seeks order in anarchy".

In the 1970s, anarcho-punk and punk rock bands such as Crass began using the circle-A symbol in red, thereby introducing it to non-anarchists. Crass founder Penny Rimbaud would later say that the band probably first saw the symbol while traveling through France.

Black cat  

The origin of the black cat symbol is unclear, but according to one story it came from an Industrial Workers of the World strike that was going badly. Several members had been beaten up and were put in a hospital. At that time a skinny, black cat walked into the striker's camp. The cat was fed by the striking workers and as the cat regained its health the strike took a turn for the better. Eventually the striking workers got some of their demands and they adopted the cat as their mascot. 

The name Black Cat has been used for numerous anarchist-affiliated collectives and cooperatives, including a music venue in Austin (which was closed following a July 6, 2002 fire) and a now-defunct "collective kitchen" in the University District of Seattle.

Slogans

No gods, no masters 

"No gods, no masters" is a phrase associated with anarchist philosophy. Likely dating back to a 15th-century German proverb, it appeared in an 1870 pamphlet by a disciple of Auguste Blanqui and became the title of Blanqui's 1880 newspaper  before it spread throughout the anarchist movement, appearing in Kropotkin's 1885 Words of Rebel and an 1896 Bordeaux anarchist manifesto. Sébastien Faure resuscitated the slogan during World War I, after which Paris's Libertarian Youth adopted the name. It has appeared on tombstones of revolutionaries, as the slogan of birth control activist Margaret Sanger's newspaper The Woman Rebel, and as the title of a  against capital punishment by Léo Ferré. In the 21st century, it has featured as a slogan for secularization of Croatia.

See also 

 Anarchism and the arts
 Anarchist Black Cross
 Anarchist schools of thought
 Black bloc
 
 Black rose (symbolism)
 Communist symbolism
 Extinction symbol
 Political colour
 Property is theft!
 
History of anarchism

References

External links 

 "Anarchism". Flags of the World.
 
 "Blog: Heart in a Hearless World".
 "History of anarchist symbols". Anarchy Is Order.
 "The Symbols of Anarchy". An Anarchist FAQ.

Activism flags
Symbolism
 
Symbolism